Pristimantis boconoensis is a species of frog in the family Strabomantidae.
It is endemic to Venezuela.
Its natural habitats are tropical moist montane forests and high-altitude grassland.
It is threatened by habitat loss.

References

boconoensis
Endemic fauna of Venezuela
Amphibians of Venezuela
Amphibians of the Andes
Amphibians described in 1973
Taxonomy articles created by Polbot